The Chumash are a Native American people of the central and southern coastal regions of California, in portions of what is now San Luis Obispo, Santa Barbara, Ventura and Los Angeles counties, extending from Morro Bay in the north to Malibu in the south. Their territory included three of the Channel Islands: Santa Cruz, Santa Rosa, and San Miguel; the smaller island of Anacapa was likely inhabited seasonally due to the lack of a consistent water source.

Modern place names with Chumash origins include Malibu, Nipomo, Lompoc, Ojai, Pismo Beach, Point Mugu, Port Hueneme, Piru, Lake Castaic, Saticoy, Simi Valley and Somis.

Archaeological research demonstrates that the Chumash people have deep roots in the Santa Barbara Channel area and lived along the southern California coast for millennia.

History

Prior to European contact (pre-1542)
Indigenous peoples have lived along the California coast for at least 11,000 years. Sites of the Millingstone Horizon date from 7000 to 4500 BC and show evidence of a subsistence system focused on the processing of seeds with metates and manos. During that time, people used bipointed bone objects and line to catch fish and began making beads from shells of the marine olive snail (Olivella biplicata). The name Chumash means "bead maker" or "seashell people" being that they originated near the Santa Barbara coast. The Chumash tribes near the coast benefited most with the "close juxtaposition of a variety or marine and terrestrial habitats, intensive upwelling in coastal waters, and intentional burning of the landscape made the Santa Barbara Channel region one of the most resource abundant places on the planet."

While droughts were not uncommon in the centuries of the first millennium AD, a population explosion occurred with the coming of the medieval warm period. "Marine productivity soared between 950 and 1300 as natural upwelling intensified off the coast." Before the mission period, the Chumash lived in over 150 independent villages, speaking variations of the same language. Much of their culture consisted of basketry, bead manufacturing and trading, cuisine of local abalone and clam, herbalism which consisted of using local herbs to produce teas and medical reliefs, rock art, and the scorpion tree. The scorpion tree was significant to the Chumash as shown in its arborglyph: a carving depicting a six-legged creature with a headdress including a crown and two spheres. The shamans participated in the carving which was used in observations of the stars and in part of the Chumash calendar.

The Chumash resided between the Santa Ynez Mountains and the California coasts where a bounty of resources could be found. The tribe lived in an area of three environments: the interior, the coast, and the Northern Channel Islands. The interior is composed of the land outside the coast and spanning the wide plains, rivers, and mountains. The coast covers the cliffs, land close to the ocean, and the areas of the ocean from which the Chumash harvested. The Northern Channel Islands lie off the coast of the Chumash territory. All of the California coastal-interior has a Mediterranean climate due to the incoming ocean winds. The mild temperatures, save for winter, made gathering easy; during the cold months, the Chumash harvested what they could and supplemented their diets with stored foods. What villagers gathered and traded during the seasons changed depending on where they resided. With coasts populated by masses of species of fish and land densely covered by trees and animals, the Chumash had a diverse array of food. Abundant resources and a winter rarely harsh enough to cause concern meant the tribe lived a sedentary lifestyle in addition to a subsistence existence. Villages in the three aforementioned areas contained remains of sea mammals, indicating that trade networks existed for moving materials throughout the Chumash territory.

The closer a village was to the ocean, the greater its reliance on maritime resources. Due to advanced canoe designs, coastal and island people could procure fish and aquatic mammals from farther out. Shellfish were a good source of nutrition: relatively easy to find and abundant. Many of the favored varieties grew in tidal zones. Shellfish grew in abundance during winter to early spring; their proximity to shore made collection easier. Some of the consumed species included mussels, abalone, and a wide array of clams. Haliotis rufescens (red abalone) was harvested along the Central California coast in the pre-contact era. The Chumash and other California Indians also used red abalone shells to make a variety of fishhooks, beads, ornaments, and other artifacts.

Ocean animals such as otters and seals were thought to be the primary meal of coastal tribes people, but recent evidence shows the aforementioned trade networks exchanged oceanic animals for terrestrial foods from the interior. Any village could acquire fish, but the coastal and island communities specialized in catching not just smaller fish, but also the massive catches such as swordfish. This feat, difficult even for today's technology, was made possible by the tomol plank canoe. Its design allowed for the capture of deepwater fish, and it facilitated trade routes between villages.

Some researchers believe that the Chumash may have been visited by Polynesians between AD 400 and 800, nearly 1,000 years before Christopher Columbus reached the Americas. The Chumash advanced sewn-plank canoe design, used throughout the Polynesian Islands but unknown in North America except by those two tribes, is cited as the chief evidence for contact. Comparative linguistics may provide evidence as the Chumash word for "sewn-plank canoe", tomolo'o, may have been derived from kumula'au, the Polynesian word for the redwood logs used in that construction. However, the language comparison is generally considered tentative. Furthermore, the development of the Chumash plank canoe is fairly well represented in the archaeological record and spans several centuries. The concept is rejected by most archaeologists who work with the Chumash culture, and there is no evidence of a genetic legacy.

Before contact with Europeans, coastal Chumash relied less on terrestrial resources than they did on maritime; vice versa for interior Chumash. Regardless, they consumed similar land resources. Like many other tribes, deer were the most important land mammal the Chumash pursued; deer were consumed in varying amounts across all regions, which cannot be said for other terrestrial animals. Interior Chumash placed greater value on the deer, to the extent that they had unique hunting practices for them. They dressed as deer and grazed alongside the animals until the hunters were in range to use their arrows. Even Chumash close to the ocean pursued deer, though in understandably fewer numbers, and what more meat the villages needed they acquired from smaller animals such as rabbits and birds. Plant foods composed the rest of Chumash diet, especially acorns, which were the staple food despite the work needed to remove their inherent toxins. They could be ground into a paste that was easy to eat and store for years. Coast live oak provided the best acorns; their mush would be served usually unseasoned with meat and/or fish.

Spanish contact and the mission period (1542–1834)

The Spaniard Juan Cabrillo was the first European to make contact with the coastal Alta Californian tribes in the year 1542. Cabrillo died and was buried on San Miguel Island, but his men brought back a diary that contained the names and population counts for many Chumash villages, such as Mikiw. Spain claimed what is now California from that time forward, but did not return to settle until 1769, when the first Spanish soldiers and missionaries arrived with the double purpose of Christianizing the Native Americans and facilitating Spanish colonization. By the end of 1770, missions and military presidios had been founded at San Diego to the south of Chumash lands and Monterey to their north.

With the arrival of the Europeans "came a series of unprecedented blows to the Chumash and their traditional lifeways. Anthropologists, historians, and other scholars have long been interested in documenting the collision of cultures that accompanied the European exploration and colonization of the Americas." Spain settled on the territory of the Chumash in 1770. They founded colonies, bringing in missionaries to begin evangelizing Native Americans in the region by forcing Chumash villages into numerous missions springing up along the coast.

The Chumash people moved from their villages to the Franciscan missions between 1772 and 1817. Mission San Luis Obispo, established in 1772, was the first mission in Chumash-speaking lands, as well as the northernmost of the five missions ever constructed in those lands. Next established, in 1782, was Mission San Buenaventura on the Pacific Coast near the mouth of the Santa Clara River. Mission Santa Barbara, also on the coast, and facing out to the Channel Islands, was established in 1786. Mission La Purisima Concepción was founded along the inland route from Santa Barbara north to San Luis Obispo in 1789. The final Franciscan mission to be constructed in native Chumash territory was Santa Ynez, founded in 1804 on the Santa Ynez River with a seed population of Chumash people from Missions La Purisima and Santa Barbara. To the southeast, Mission San Fernando, founded in 1798 in the land of Takic Shoshonean speakers, also took in large numbers of Chumash speakers from the middle Santa Clara River valley. While most of the Chumash people joined one mission or another between 1772 and 1806, a significant portion of the native inhabitants of the Channel Islands did not move to the mainland missions until 1816.

Mexican era (1834–1848)

Mexico seized control of the missions in 1834. Tribespeople either fled into the interior, attempted farming for themselves and were driven off the land, or were enslaved by the new administrators. Many found highly exploitative work on large Mexican ranches. After 1849 most Chumash land was lost due to theft by Americans and a declining population, due to the effects of violence and disease. The remaining Chumash began to lose their cohesive identity. In 1855, a small piece of land (120 acres) was set aside for just over 100 remaining Chumash Indians near Santa Ynez mission. This land ultimately became the only Chumash reservation, although Chumash individuals and families also continued to live throughout their former territory in southern California. Today, the Santa Ynez band lives at and near Santa Ynez. The Chumash population was between roughly 10,000 and 18,000 in the late 18th century. In 1990, 213 Indians lived on the Santa Ynez Reservation.

American era (1848–present)

The Chumash reservation, established in 1901, encompasses 127 acres. No native Chumash speak their own language since Mary Yee, the last Barbareño speaker, died in 1965. Today, the Chumash are estimated to have a population of 5,000 members. Many current members can trace their ancestors to the five islands of Channel Islands National Park.

Beginning in the 1970s, neo-Chumash arose, tracing their lineage nearly completely from the descendants of Spanish colonists to the domain of the initial Chumash people. They promote traditions of the Chumash, and are recognized locally. Their cultural assumption has been criticized by some, but is supported by others.

The first modern tomol was built and launched in 1976 as a result of a joint venture between Quabajai Chumash of the Coastal Band of the Chumash Nation and the Santa Barbara Museum of Natural History. Its name is Helek/Xelex, the Chumash word for falcon. The Brotherhood of the Tomol was revived and her crew paddled and circumnavigated around the Santa Barbara Channel Islands on a 10-day journey, stopping on three of the islands. The second tomol, the Elye'wun ("swordfish"), was launched in 1997.

On September 9, 2001, the first "crossing" in the Chumash tomol, from the mainland to Channel Islands, was sponsored by the Chumash Maritime Association and the Barbareño Chumash Council. Several Chumash bands and descendants gathered on the island of Limuw (the Chumash name for Santa Cruz Island) to witness the Elye'wun being paddled from the mainland to Santa Cruz Island. Their journey was documented in the short film "Return to Limuw" produced by the Ocean Channel for the Chumash Maritime Association, Channel Islands National Marine Sanctuary, and the Santa Barbara Maritime Museum. The channel crossings have become a yearly event hosted by the Barbareño Chumash Council.

The Santa Ynez Band of Chumash is a federally recognized Chumash tribe. They have the Santa Ynez Reservation located in Santa Barbara County, near Santa Ynez. Chumash people are also enrolled in the Tejon Indian Tribe of California.

In addition to the Santa Ynez Band, the Coastal Band of the Chumash Nation and the Barbareño/Ventureño Band of Mission Indians are attempting to gain federal recognition. Other Chumash tribal groups include the Northern Chumash Tribal Council, descendants from the San Luis Obispo area, and the Barbareño Chumash Council, descendants from the greater Santa Barbara area.

The publication of the first Chumash dictionary took place in April 2008. Six hundred pages long and containing 4,000 entries, the Samala-English Dictionary includes more than 2,000 illustrations.

The documentary film 6 Generations: A Chumash Family History features Mary Yee, the last speaker of the Barbareño Chumash language.

Produce initiative
In December 2010, the Foodbank of Santa Barbara County was the recipient of a $10,000 grant from the Santa Ynez Band of Chumash Indians Foundation to support expansion of the Produce Initiative. The Produce Initiative puts an emphasis on supplying fruits and vegetables to 264 local nonprofits and food programs. The foodbank distributes produce free of charge to member agencies to encourage healthy eating. Expanding produce accessibility to children is important to the foodbank and the newly operating Kids’ Farmers' Market program, an extension of the Produce Initiative, achieves that goal.

The program trains volunteers to teach kids in after-school programs nutrition education and hands-on cooking instructions. This program currently operates at 12 sites countywide, including in the Santa Ynez Valley. After the children cook and eat a healthy meal, they get to take home a bag full of fresh produce, where they can help feed and cook for the whole family. Obesity in children is a major health problem prevalent among Native Americans.

To promote sustainable agriculture and healthy diets, the Santa Ynez Band of Chumash Environmental Office and Education Departments' after-school program planted a community garden, which provided vegetables to the Elder's Council, beginning in 2013. The Santa Ynez Valley Fruit and Vegetable Rescue, also known as Veggie Rescue, is another effort to improve food sourcing for the Santa Ynez.

Worldview 
Chumash worldview is centered on the belief "that considers all things to be, in varying measure, alive, intelligent, dangerous, and sacred." According to Thomas Blackburn in December's Child: A Book of Chumash Oral Narratives published in 1980, the Chumash do not have a creation story like Tongva, Acjachemen, Quechnajuichom, and other Takic-speaking peoples. Rather, as summarized by Susan Suntree, "they assume that the universe with its three, or in some version five, layers has always been here. Human beings occupy the middle region, which rests upon two giant snakes. Chronological time is unimportant, though the past is divided into two sections: the universal flood that caused the First People to become the natural world and, thereafter the creation of human beings, the arrival of the Europeans, and the devastating consequences that followed."

The middle region (sometimes referred to as antap), where humans and spirits of this world live and where shamans could travel in vision quests, is interconnected with the lower world (C'oyinahsup) through the springs and marsh areas and is connected to the upper world through the mountains. In the lower world live snakes, frogs, salamanders. The world trembles or has earthquakes when the snakes which support the world writhe. Water creatures are also in contact with the powers of the lower world and "were often depicted in rock art perhaps to bring more water to the Chumash or to appease underworld spirits' at times of hunger or disease." Itiashap is the home of the First People. Alapay is the upper world in Chumash cosmology where the "sky people" lived, who play an important role in the health of the people. Principle figures of the sky world include the Sun, the Moon, Lizard, Sky Coyote, and Eagle. The Sun is the source of life and is also "a source of disease and death."

Chumash bands 
One Chumash band, the Santa Ynez Band of Chumash Mission Indians of the Santa Ynez Reservation is a federally recognized tribe, and other Chumash people are enrolled in the federally-recognized Tejon Indian Tribe of California. There are 14 bands of Chumash Indians.

 Barbareño Chumash, affiliated with the Taynayan missions and the Kashwa reservations.
 Coastal Band of the Chumash Nation, their historical territory, north of Los Angeles, includes parts of the coastal counties of Santa Barbara, San Luis Obispo, Kern, and Ventura. The Coastal band of the Chumash Nation applied for recognition in 1981.
 Cuyama Chumash, from the Cuyama Valley.
 Island Chumash, from the Channel Islands.
 Kagismuwas Chumash, from the southwesternmost region of the ancestral Chumash land. Their historical lands are now part of Vandenberg Air Force Base.
 Los Angeles Chumash, formed when members of the traditional Malibu, Tejon, and Ventura bands were relocated in the 19th century.
 Malibu Chumash, from the coast of Malibu. Descendants of this band can now be found among the Ventura, Coastal, Tejon, and San Fernando Valley bands.
 Monterey Chumash, from the Monterey Peninsula.
Samala, or Santa Ynez Chumash. The Santa Ynez Chumash people in 2012 went to federal court to regain more land. The Bureau of Indian Affairs approved the request; the land was to go toward tribal housing and a Chumash Museum and Cultural Center. Protesters and anti-tribal groups have spent approximately $2 million to disrupt or stop the land acquisition.
 San Fernando Valley Chumash, once laborers at the Mission San Fernando Rey de España. They intermarried other tribes who also worked at the mission.
 Yak Tityu Tityu Yak Tilhini Northern Chumash, homelands from coastal Avila Beach to Morro Bay. They are the northwesternmost Chumash people, located in San Luis Obispo County.
 Tecuya Chumash, most of this band of Chumash tribe were probably Kagismuwas. This band was established as an anti-colonial group, who took residence in the Tecuya Canyon along with the Tejon Chumash.
Tejon Chumash, part of the Kern County Chumash Council. Tejon is the Spanish word for "badger", and its name was given to the Tejon Rancheria.
 Ventura Chumash, lives in the traditional Chumash domain of the Owl Clan.

Population

Estimates for the precontact populations of most native groups in California have varied substantially. The anthropologist Alfred L. Kroeber thought the 1770 population of the Chumash might have been about 10,000. Alan K. Brown concluded that the population was about 15,000. Sherburne F. Cook, at various times, estimated the aboriginal Chumash as 8,000, 13,650, 20,400, or 18,500.

Some scholars have suggested the Chumash population may have declined substantially during a "protohistoric" period (1542–1769), when intermittent contacts with the crews of Spanish ships, including those of Juan Rodriguez Cabrillo's expedition, who wintered in the Santa Barbara Channel in AD 1542–43, brought disease and death. The Chumash appear to have been thriving in the late 18th century, when Spaniards first began actively colonizing the California coast. Whether the deaths began earlier with the contacts with ships' crews or later with the construction of several Spanish missions at Ventura, Santa Barbara, Lompoc, Santa Ynez, and San Luis Obispo, the Chumash were eventually devastated by the California Genocide carried out when the United States took over the territory. By 1900, their numbers had declined to just 200, while current estimates of Chumash people today range from 2,000 to 5,000.

The demographics of traditional Chumash society are quite complex. One aspect of interest is the 'Aqi gender of the Chumash. 'Aqi was a third Chumash gender defined by biological males that performed work and wore clothing traditionally of women. The 'aqi gender appears to also be closely tied to non-procreative sexual activity, such as homosexuality.

Languages

Several related languages under the name "Chumash" (from čʰumaš , meaning "Santa Cruz Islander") were spoken. No native speakers remain, although the dialects are well documented in the unpublished fieldnotes of linguist John Peabody Harrington. Especially well documented are the Barbareño, Ineseño, and Ventureño dialects. In 2010, the Šmuwič Chumash Language School was established at Wishtoyo's Chumash Village. The language reclamation program in 2010 was initially run by Elder Johnny Moreno and his niece Deborah Sanchez. The language classes were revitalized in 2016 and Sanchez is the sole instructor. The traditional name for Chumash in Ineseño is s'amala  and the Chumash name for the Barbareño people is Šmuwič.

Culture

The Chumash were hunter-gatherers and were adept at fishing at the time of Spanish colonization. They are one of the relatively few New World peoples who regularly navigated the ocean (another was the Tongva, a neighboring tribe to the south). Some settlements built a plank boat (tomol), which facilitated the distribution of goods and could be used for whaling.

Basketry

Anthropologists have long collected Chumash baskets. Two of the largest collections are at the Smithsonian Institution in Washington, DC, and the Musée de l'Homme (Museum of Mankind) in Paris. The Santa Barbara Museum of Natural History is believed to have the largest collection of Chumash baskets.

Bead manufacture and trading
The Chumash of the Northern Channel Islands were at the center of an intense regional trade network. Beads made from Olivella shells were manufactured on the Channel Islands and used as a form of currency by the Chumash. These shell beads were traded to neighboring groups and have been found throughout Alta California. Over the course of late prehistory, millions of shell beads were manufactured and traded from Santa Cruz Island. It has been suggested that exclusive control over stone quarries used to manufacture the drills needed in bead production could have played a role in the development of social complexity in Chumash society.

Cuisine
Foods historically consumed by the Chumash include several marine species, such as black abalone, the Pacific littleneck clam, red abalone, the bent-nosed clam, ostrea lurida oysters, angular unicorn snails, and the butternut clam. Acorns served as an important plant food, which were ground up and cooked into a soup. They also made flour from the dried fruits of the laurel sumac.

Herbalism

Herbs used in traditional Chumash medicine include thick-leaved yerba santa, used to keep airways open for proper breathing; laurel sumac, the root bark of which was used to make a herbal tea for treating dysentery; and black sage, the leaves and stems were made into a strong sun tea. This was rubbed on the painful area or used to soak one's feet. The plant contains diterpenoids, such as aethiopinone and ursolic acid, which are known pain relievers.

The Chumash formerly practiced an initiation rite involving the use of sacred datura (moymoy in their language). When a boy was 8 years old, his mother would give him a preparation of it to drink. This was supposed to be a spiritual challenge to help him develop the spiritual wellbeing required to become a man. Not all of the boys survived the poison.

Rock art

Remains of a developed Chumash culture, including rock paintings apparently depicting the Chumash cosmology, such as Chumash Painted Cave State Historic Park, can still be seen.

Scorpion tree
A centuries-old oak tree in California is considered to have a Chumash arborglyph, a carving of a six-legged creature with a head-dress including a crown and two spheres. Previously thought to have been carved by cowboys, it was visited in 2007 by paleontologist Rex Saint Onge, who identified the three-foot carving as being of Chumash origin and related to other Chumash cave paintings in California. Further studies have led Saint Onge to believe these are not simply the work of Chumash, but by Chumash shamans who were conscious observers of the stars, and used these carvings to calibrate the Chumash calendar.

Notable people 
This is a list of notable Chumash people:
 Lorna Dee Cervantes (born 1954), an award-winning feminist, activist, poet and Chicana of Chumash descent
Deborah A. Miranda (born 1961), a writer and poet of Chumash-Esselen-French descent
John Olguin (1921–2011), former director Cabrillo Marine Aquarium, founder of the Cabrillo Whalewatch, and founding member of the American Cetacean Society
Rafael Solares (1822–1890), a Samala chief, captain of Soxtonoxmu, capital village in the Santa Ynez Valley who shared cultural knowledge with anthropologists in the 1800s
Fernando Librado (1839–1915), elder, master tomol builder, craft specialist, philosopher, and storyteller.
Mary Joachina Yee (1897–1965), linguist and last known speaker of the Barbareño language
Ernestine Ygnacio-De Soto, Chumash activist and historian, working on reviving the Barbareño language.
Semu Huaute (1908–2004), medicine man, actor, and alleged last full-blooded Chumash

Places of significance 

Places of significant archaeological and historical value.

 Albinger Archaeological Museum in Ventura – Chumash artifacts and history
 Burro Flats Painted Cave in Simi Valley – Chumash pictographs 
 Carpinteria State Beach in Carpinteria – cave paintings depicting Chumash life
 Carpinteria Valley Museum of History and Historical Society in Carpinteria – Chumash artifacts and history 
 Chumash Indian Museum in Thousand Oaks – exhibitions of artifacts and recreation of Chumash houses 
 Chumash Painted Cave State Historic Park in Santa Barbara – cave paintings
 Hollister Adobe Museum in San Luis Obispo – Chumash artifacts and exhibits 
 Iwihinmu (Mount Pinos) – place of Chumash cultural significance
 La Purísima Mission State Historic Park in Lompoc – displays of mission life in reconstructed buildings 
 Lompoc Museum in Lompoc – Chumash artifacts and history 
 Los Angeles County Museum of Natural History in Los Angeles – anthropology and guided tours for Chumash natural history 
 Mission San Luis Obispo Museum – Chumash artifacts and exhibits 
 Morro Bay Museum of Natural History – docent presentations and Chumash exhibits 
 Museum of Ventura County – exhibits on Chumash history
 Ojai Valley Museum and Historical Society in Ojai. Inland Chumash history. 
 Painted Rock, Carrizo Plain Natural Heritage Reserve in San Luis Obispo County – cave paintings 
 Port Hueneme Historical Society Museum in Port Hueneme - Chumash speakers (Distinguished Speaker Series) exhibit on Chumash history and artifacts
 San Buenaventura Mission Museum in Ventura – exhibits on Chumash history 
 San Luis Obispo County Historical Museum – Chumash artifacts and exhibits. 
 Santa Barbara Historical Society in Santa Barbara. Guided tours. 
 Santa Barbara Mission in Santa Barbara. Local Chumash history and guided tours. 
 Santa Barbara Mission Archive-Library. Records of all California mission Indians. < https://web.archive.org/web/20191127055954/https://www.sbmal.org/>
 Santa Barbara Museum of Natural History – exhibits on Chumash Indians and natural history of Native Americans 
 Santa Barbara Presidio – historical exhibits 
 Santa Cruz Island – cave paintings in Olsen's Cave: More than 300,000 Chumash objects have been collected in the Channel Islands, which was home to 10 villages and more than 1200 Chumash residents.
 San Luis Obispo County Historical Museum – Chumash artifacts and exhibits 
 Mission Santa Inés in Solvang – site of an early Spanish mission 
 Santa Maria Valley Historical Society Museum – Chumash artifacts and exhibits
 Santa Rosa Island – cave paintings in Jones Cave. Thousands of artifacts of the island, which has been populated by the Chumash for more than 13,000 years, have been found. 
 Santa Ynez Indian Reservation (Samala) – the only Chumash Indian reservation 
 Satwiwa – ancient Chumash village and now museum in Newbury Park, CA
 Southwest Museum in Highland Park
 Shalawa Meadow – a former Chumash burial ground
 Toshololo (Frazier Mountain) – place of Chumash cultural significance

See also

 Burro Flats Painted Cave
 Chumash Painted Cave State Historic Park, California
 Chumash traditional narratives
 Polynesian navigation
 Pre-Columbian trans-oceanic contact
 Shalawa Meadow, California

Notes

References 
 Arnold, Jeanne E. (ed.) 2001. The Origins of a Pacific Coast Chiefdom: The Chumash of the Channel Islands. Salt Lake City: University of Utah Press.
 

 
 Cook, Sherburne F. 1976. The Conflict between the California Indian and White Civilization. University of California Press, Berkeley.
 Cook, Sherburne F. 1976. The Population of the California Indians, 1769–1970. University of California Press, Berkeley.

Cordero R. The Ancestors Are Dreaming Us. News From Native California [serial online]. Spring2012 2012;25(3):4–27. Available from: Academic Search Premier, Ipswich, MA. Accessed March 22, 2014. 

 
 
Gamble, L. H., & Enki Library eBook. (2008). The chumash world at European contact (1st ed.). Us: University of California Press. Retrieved from http://sjpl.enkilibrary.org/EcontentRecord/11197
 Glassow, Michael A., Lynn H. Gamble, Jennifer E. Perry, and Glenn S. Russell. 2007. Prehistory of the Northern California Bight and the Adjacent Transverse Ranges. In California Prehistory: Colonization, Culture, and Complexity. Terry L. Jones and Kathryn A. Klar, editors. New York and Plymouth UK: Altamira Press.
 Hogan, C. Michael. 2008. Morro Creek. Ed. A. Burnham.
 
 King, Chester D. 1991. Evolution of Chumash Society: A Comparative Study of Artifacts Used for Social System Maintenance in the Santa Barbara Channel Region before A.D. 1804. New York and London, Garland Press.
 Kroeber, A. L. 1925. Handbook of the Indians of California. Bureau of American Ethnology Bulletin No. 78. Washington, D.C.
 McLendon, Sally and John R. Johnson. 1999. Cultural Affiliation and Lineal Descent of Chumash Peoples in the Channel Islands and the Santa Monica Mountains. 2 volumes. Prepared for the Archeology and Ethnography Program, National Park Service by Hunter College, City University of New York and the Santa Barbara Museum of Natural History.
 Mithun, Marianne. (1999). The Languages of Native North America. Cambridge: Cambridge University Press. .
 Pritzker, Barry M. A Native American Encyclopedia: History, Culture, and Peoples. Oxford: Oxford University Press, 2000. .
 Pritzker, Barry M. (2014). Chumash. In The American Mosaic: The American Indian Experience. Retrieved February 25, 2014, from http://americanindian2.abc-clio.com.libaccess.sjlibrary.org/
Sandos J. Christianization among the Chumash: an ethnohistoric perspective. American Indian Quarterly [serial online]. Winter91 1991;15:65–89. Available from: OmniFile Full Text Mega (H.W. Wilson), Ipswich, MA. Accessed March 22, 2014.
Santa Barbara Independent. (2010, December 15). Chumash foundation $10,000 grant helps food bank serve healthy meals.

 Chumash Tribe sued over casino expansion

Further reading
 Black Gold Library System, 1997, Native Americans of the Central Coast (historic photographs). Ventura, CA, Black Gold Libraries
 Hudson, D. Travis and Thomas C. Blackburn. 1982–7. The Material Culture of the Chumash Interaction Sphere Volumes I–V. Anthropological Papers No. 25-31. Menlo Park, CA: Ballena Press.
 Hudson, D. Travis, Thomas Blackburn, Rosario Curletti and Janice Timbrook. 1977. The Eye of the Flute: Chumash Traditional History and Ritual as Told by Fernando Librado Kitsepawit to John P. Harrington. Santa Barbara Museum of Natural History.
 Hudson, D. Travis, Janice Timbrook, and Melissa Rempe. 1977. Tomol: Chumash Watercraft as Described in the Ethnographic Notes of John P. Harrington. Anthropological Papers No. 9, edited by Lowell J. Bean and Thomas C. Blackburn. Socorro, NM: Ballena Press.

External links

Santa Ynez Band of Chumash Indians
Inezeño Chumash Language Tutorial
Coastal Band of the Chumash Nation
Antelope Valley Indian Museum at California Department of Parks and Recreation
Native Cultures and the Maritime Heritage Program, NOAA
Barbareno Chumash Council
Northern Chumash Tribal Council
Chumash Painted Cave State Historic Park
Chumash Singer and Storyteller Julie Tumamait-Stenslie 
Chumash Indian Museum, Thousand Oaks, CA
Map of Chumash towns at the time of European Settlement

 
 
California Mission Indians
Native American tribes in California
History of San Luis Obispo County, California
History of Santa Barbara County, California
History of Ventura County, California